Encaustic painting, also known as hot wax painting, is a form of painting that involves a heated wax medium to which colored pigments have been added. The molten mix is applied to a surface—usually prepared wood, though canvas and other materials are sometimes used. The simplest encaustic medium could be made by adding pigments to wax, though recipes most commonly consist of beeswax and damar resin, potentially with other ingredients.  For pigmentation, dried powdered pigments can be used, though some artists use pigmented wax, inks, oil paints or other forms of pigmentation.

Metal tools and special brushes can be used to shape the medium as it cools. Also, heated metal tools, including spatulas, knives and scrapers, can be used to manipulate the medium after it has cooled onto the surface.  Additionally, heat lamps, torches, heat guns, and other methods of applying heat are used by encaustic artists to fuse and bind the medium. Because encaustic medium is thermally malleable, the medium can be also sculpted.  And/or, materials can be encased, collaged or layered into the medium.

A completely unrelated type of "encaustic painting", not involving wax at all, is found in British ceramics, after Josiah Wedgwood devised and patented the technique in 1769.  This was a mixture of ceramic slip and overglaze "enamel" paints used to imitate ancient Greek vase painting, and given a light second firing.  Usually the vessel was black and painted in the red of red-figure painting.  The technique was copied by other British potteries.  Encaustic tiles are not painted at all, but effectively inlaid with contrasting colours of clay for a polychrome pattern.

History 

Encaustice or Encaustike (ἐγκαυστική) was the art of painting by burning in the colours.

The wax encaustic painting technique was described by the Roman scholar Pliny the Elder in his Natural History from the 1st Century AD. The oldest surviving encaustic panel paintings are the Romano-Egyptian Fayum mummy portraits from Egypt, around 100–300 AD, but was a very common technique in ancient Greek and Roman painting.  It continued to be used in early Byzantine icons but was effectively abandoned in the Western Church.

Kut-kut, a lost art of the Philippines, employs sgraffito and encaustic techniques. It was practiced by the indigenous tribe of Samar island around 1600 to 1800. Artists in the Mexican muralism movement, such as Diego Rivera, Fernando Leal (artist) and Jean Charlot sometimes used encaustic painting. The Belgian artist James Ensor also experimented with encaustic.

In the 20th century, painter Fritz Faiss (1905–1981), a student of Paul Klee and Wassily Kandinsky at the Bauhaus, together with Dr. Hans Schmid, rediscovered the so-called Punic wax technique of encaustic painting. Faiss held two German patents related to the preparation of waxes for encaustic painting. This occurred after boiling the wax in a solution of sea water and soda three successive times. The resulting harder wax is the same as the Punic wax referred to in ancient Greek writings on encaustic painting. Other 20th-century North American artists, including Jasper Johns, Tony Scherman, Mark Perlman, John Shaw and Fernando Leal Audirac, have used encaustic techniques.

Encaustic art has seen a resurgence in popularity since the 1990s, with artists using electric irons, hotplates and heated styli on different surfaces, including card, paper, and even pottery. The iron makes producing a variety of artistic patterns easier. The medium is not limited to just simple designs; it can also be used to create complex paintings, just as in other media such as oil and acrylic. Although technically difficult to master, attractions of this medium for contemporary artists are its dimensional quality and luminous color.

Encaustic painters
Artists specializing in encaustic painting include the following:
 Benjamin Calau
 Betsy Eby
 Bridgette Meinhold
 Christel Dillbohner
 Esther Geller
 Fernando Leal Audirac
 Fritz Faiss
 Heraclides
 Janise Yntema
 Jasper Johns
 Jenny Sages
 John K. Lawson
 Karl Zerbe
 Michael David
 Michele Ridolfi
 Pausias
 Pedro Cuni-Bravo
 Rodney Carswell
 Thomas Dodd
 Tony Scherman

See also 
 Encaustic tile

Notes

References 
 
 

Young, Hilary (ed.), The Genius of Wedgwood (exhibition catalogue), 1995, Victoria and Albert Museum,

Further reading 

Déneux, Gabriel. La Peinture à l'Encaustique, Paris: Imprimerie de La société de typographie, 1890.
Gottsegen, Mark David (2006). Painter's Handbook: Revised and Expanded (Revised, Expanded ed.). New York: Watson-Guptill. p. 60. .
 Hildebrandt, Hans. "Fritz Faiss" Kunst der Nation, 1933
 
 
 
 
 Reams, Maxine. "Unique Wax Paintings by Immigrant Artist should Endure 10,000 Years." Los Angeles Times, Oct. 19, 1952

External links 

 All Things Encaustic 
  Early Icons from St. Catherine's, The Sinai
 Encaustic Art Today

Painting techniques
Painting materials
Visual arts media